Charles E. Smith (October 21, 1889 – January 2, 1969) was an American sailor who competed in the 1932 Summer Olympics.

In 1932 he was a crew member of the American boat Gallant which won the silver medal in the 6 meter class.

External links
profile

1889 births
1969 deaths
American male sailors (sport)
Sailors at the 1932 Summer Olympics – 6 Metre
Olympic silver medalists for the United States in sailing
Medalists at the 1932 Summer Olympics